{
  "type": "FeatureCollection",
  "features": [
    {
      "type": "Feature",
      "properties": {},
      "geometry": {
        "type": "Point",
        "coordinates": [
          24.262521,
          58.778248
        ]
      }
    }
  ]
}

The ice circle of Vana-Vigala is a natural phenomenon appearing on the Vigala River in Estonia while the river freezes.

It can be seen in Vana-Vigala village near the old manor park.

The diameter of the disk is approximately 23–24 m.
The first documented mention of this phenomenon is in 2004.

Gallery

References 

Snow or ice weather phenomena